The list of kings of Ebla includes the known monarchs of Ebla who ruled three consecutive kingdoms. For the first kingdom's monarchs, tablets listing offerings to kings mention ten names, and another list mentions 33 kings. No kings are known from the second kingdom and all dates are estimates according to the Middle chronology.

The list

Notes

References

Citations

Sources

Alfonso Archi and Maria Giovanna Biga, "A Victory over Mari and the Fall of Ebla", Journal of Cuneiform Studies, vol. 55, pp. 1–44, 2003

 
Ebla